Tadashi Maeda (born December 1957) is governor of the Japan Bank for International Cooperation. He was previously senior managing director He is a member of the council of the International Institute for Strategic Studies.

References

1957 births
Living people
Japanese bankers